Rawalpindi (Punjabi,) is a city in the Punjab province of Pakistan. It is the fourth most populous city in Pakistan after Karachi, Lahore, and Faisalabad, and third populous in Punjab after Lahore and Faisalabad. Rawalpindi is situated close to Pakistan's capital Islamabad, and the two are jointly known as the "twin cities" because of the social and economic links between them.
	
Rawalpindi is on the Pothohar Plateau, it was founded as a village by Bappa Rawal in 9th century AD and remained a small town of less importance up until 18th century. Potohar region was known for its ancient Hindu and Buddhist heritage, especially in the neighbouring town of Taxila, a UNESCO World Heritage Site.  In 1765, the ruling Gakhars were defeated and the city came under Sikh rule, Rawalpindi from a small regional town became an important city within the Sikh Empire based at Lahore. The city's Babu Mohallah neighbourhood was once home to a community of Jewish traders that had fled Mashhad, Persia, in the 1830s. The city was conquered by the British Raj in 1849, and in the late 19th century became the largest garrison town of the British Indian Army's Northern command as its climate suited the British authorities. Britain's army elevated the city from a small town to the third largest city in Punjab by 1921. Following the partition of British India in 1947, the city became home to the headquarters of the Pakistan Army, retaining its status as a major military city.

In 1951, the Rawalpindi conspiracy took place in which leftist army officers conspired to depose the first elected Prime Minister of Pakistan, Liaquat Ali Khan. Rawalpindi later became the site of the Liaquat Ali Khan's assassination. On 27 December 2007, Rawalpindi was the site of the assassination of former Prime Minister Benazir Bhutto.

Construction of Pakistan's new purpose-built national capital city of Islamabad in 1961 led to greater investment in the city provided by IMF and local banks, as well as a brief stint as the country's capital before the completion of Islamabad. Modern Rawalpindi is socially and economically intertwined with Islamabad, and the greater metropolitan area. The city is also home to numerous suburban housing developments that serve as bedroom-communities for workers in Islamabad. As home to the GHQ of the Pakistan Army and PAF Base Nur Khan, and with connections to the M-1 and M-2 motorways, Rawalpindi is a major logistics and transportation centre for northern Pakistan. The city is also home to historic havelis and temples, and serves as a hub for tourists visiting Rohtas Fort, Azad Kashmir, Taxila and Gilgit-Baltistan.

History

Origins
The region around Rawalpindi has been inhabited for thousands of years. It was founded as a village by Bappa Rawal, and remained a regional town of less importance up until late 18th century when it became an important city within Mughal empire. Rawalpindi falls within the ancient boundaries of Gandhara, and is thus in a region containing many Buddhist ruins. In the region north-west of Rawalpindi, traces have been found of at least 55 stupas, 28 Buddhist monasteries, 9 temples, and various artifacts in the Kharoshthi script.

To the southeast are the ruins of the Mankiala stupa – a second-century stupa where, according to the Jataka tales, a previous incarnation of the Buddha leapt off a cliff in order to offer his corpse to seven hungry tiger cubs. The nearby town of Taxila is thought to have been home to the world's first university. Sir Alexander Cunningham identified ruins on the site of the Rawalpindi Cantonment as the ancient city of Ganjipur (or Gajnipur), the capital of the Bhatti tribe in the ages preceding the Christian era.

Medieval
The first mention of Rawalpindi's earliest settlement dates from when Mahmud of Ghazni destroyed Rawalpindi and the town was restored by Gakhar chief Kai Gohar in the early 11th century. The town fell into decay again after Mongol invasions in the 14th century. Situated along an invasion route, the settlement did not prosper and remained deserted until 1493, when Jhanda Khan re-established the ruined town, and named it Rawal.

Mughal

During the Mughal era, Rawalpindi remained under the rule of the Ghakhar clan, who in turn pledged allegiance to the Mughal Empire. The city was developed as an important outpost in order to guard the frontiers of the Mughal realm. Gakhars fortified a nearby caravanserai, in the 16th century, transforming it into the Rawat Fort in order to defend the Pothohar plateau from Sher Shah Suri's forces. Construction of the Attock Fort in 1581 after Akbar led a campaign against his brother Mirza Muhammad Hakim, further securing Rawalpindi's environs. In December 1585, the Emperor Akbar arrived in Rawalpindi, and remained in and around Rawalpindi for 13 years as he extended the frontiers of the empire, in an era described as a "glorious period" in his career as Emperor.

With the onset of chaos and rivalry between Gakhar chiefs after the death of Kamal Khan in 1559, Rawalpindi was awarded to Said Khan by the Mughal Emperor. The Emperor Jehangir visited the royal camp in Rawalpindi in 1622, where he first learned of Shah Abbas I of Persia's plan to invade Kandahar.

Sikh Misl
Rawalpindi declined in importance as Mughal power declined, until the town was captured in the mid-1760s from Muqarrab Khan by the Sikhs under Sardar Gujjar Singh and his son Sahib Singh. The city's administration was handed to Sardar Milkha Singh, who then invited traders from the neighbouring commercial centers of Jhelum and Shahpur to settle in the territory in 1766. The city then began to prosper, although the population in 1770 is estimated to have been only about 300 families. Rawalpindi became for a time the refuge of Shah Shuja, the exiled king of Afghanistan, and of his brother Shah Zaman in the early 19th century.

Sikh Empire
Sikh ruler Maharaja Ranjit Singh allowed the son of Sardar Milkha Singh to continue as Governor of Rawalpindi, after Ranjit Singh seized the district in 1810. Sikh rule over Rawalpindi was consolidated by defeat of the Afghans at Haidaran in July 1813. The Sikh rulers allied themselves with some of the local Gakhar tribes, and jointly defeated Syed Ahmad Barelvi at Akora Khattak in 1827, and again in 1831 in Balakot. Jews first arrived in Rawalpindi's Babu Mohallah neighbourhood from Mashhad, Persia in 1839, in order to flee from anti-Jewish laws instituted by the Qajar dynasty. In 1841, Diwan Kishan Kaur was appointed Sardar of Rawalpindi.

On 14 March 1849, Sardar Chattar Singh and Raja Sher Singh of the Sikh Empire surrendered to General Gilbert near Rawalpindi, ceding the city to the British. The Sikh Empire then came to an end on 29 March 1849.

British

Following Rawalpindi's capture by the British East India company, 53rd Regiment of the company army took quarters in the newly captured city. The decision to man a permanent military cantonment in the city was made in 1851 by the Marquess of Dalhousie. The city saw its first telegraph office in the early 1850s. The city's Garrison Church was built shortly after in 1854, and is the site where Robert Milman, Bishop of Calcutta, was buried following his death in Rawalpindi in 1876. The city was home to 15,913 people in the 1855 census. During the 1857 Sepoy Mutiny, the area's Gakhars and Janjua tribes remained loyal to the British.
Numerous civil and military buildings were built during the British era, and the Municipality of Rawalpindi was constituted in 1867, while the city's population as per the 1868 census was 19,228, with another 9,358 people residing in the city's cantonment. The city was also connected to railways that offered connection to India and the northwest frontier in Peshawar in the 1880s. The Commissariat Steam Flour Mills were the first such mills in Punjab, and supplied most of the needs of British cantonments throughout Punjab. Rawalpindi's cantonment served as a feeder to other cantonments throughout the region.

Rawalpindi flourished as a commercial centre, though the city remained largely devoid of an industrial base during the British era. A large portion of Kashmir's external trade passing through the city; in 1885, 14% of Kashmir's exports, and 27% of its imports passed through the city. A large market was opened in central Rawalpindi in 1883 by Sardar Sujan Singh, while the British further developed a shopping district for the city's elite known as Saddar with an archway built to commemorate Brigadier General Massey.

Rawalpindi's cantonment became a major centre of military power of the Raj after an arsenal was established in 1883. Britain's army elevated the city from a small town, to the third largest city in Punjab by 1921. In 1868, 9,358 people lived in the city's cantonment – by 1891, the number rose to 37,870. In 1891, the city's population excluding the Cantonment was 34,153. The city was considered to be a favourite first posting for newly arrived soldiers from England, owing to the city's agreeable climate, and the nearby hill station of Murree. In 1901, Rawalpindi was made the winter headquarters of the Northern Command and of the Rawalpindi military division. Riots broke out against British rule in 1905, following a famine in Punjab that peasants were led to believe was a deliberate act.

During World War I, Rawalpindi District "stood first" among districts in recruiting for the British war effort, with greater financial assistance from the British government channeled into the area in return. By 1921, Rawalpindi's cantonment had overshadowed the city - Rawalpindi was one of seven cities of Punjab in which over half the population lived in the cantonment district. Communal riots erupted between Rawalpindi's Sikh and Muslim communities in 1926 after Sikhs refused to silence music from a procession that was passing in front of a mosque.

 was launched as an ocean liner in 1925 by Harland and Wolff, the same company which built . The ship was converted into an armed vessel, and was sunk in October 1939. The British government carried out poison gas testing on Indian troops during the Rawalpindi experiments over the course of more than a decade beginning in the 1930s.

Partition
On 5 March 1947, members of Rawalpindi's Hindu and Sikh communities took out a procession against the formation of a Muslim ministry within the Government of Punjab. Policemen fired upon protestors, while Hindus and Sikhs fought against weaker Muslim counter-protestors. The area's first Partition riots erupted the next day on 6 March 1947, when the city's Muslims, angered by the actions of Hindus and Sikhs and encouraged by the Pir of Golra Sharif, raided nearby villages after they were unable to do so in the city on account of Rawalpindi's heavily armed Sikhs.

At the dawn of Pakistan's independence in 1947 following the success of the Pakistan Movement, Rawalpindi was a 43.79% Muslim, while Rawalpindi District as a whole was 80% Muslim. The region, on account of its large Muslim majority, was thus awarded to Pakistan. Rawalpindi's Hindu and Sikh population, who had made up 33.72% and 17.32% of the city, migrated en masse to the newly independent Dominion of India after anti-Hindu and anti-Sikh pogroms in western Punjab, while Muslim refugees from India settled in the city following anti-Muslim pogroms in eastern Punjab and northern India.

Modern

In the years following independence, Rawalpindi saw an influx of Muhajir, Pashtun and Kashmiri settlers. Having been the largest British Cantonment in the region at the dawn of Pakistan's independence, Rawalpindi was chosen as headquarters for the Pakistani Army, despite the fact that Karachi had been selected as the first capital.

In 1951, the Rawalpindi conspiracy took place in which leftist army officers conspired to depose the first elected Prime Minister of Pakistan, Liaquat Ali Khan. Rawalpindi later became the site of the Liaquat Ali Khan's assassination, in what is now known as Liaquat Bagh Park. In 1958, Field Marshal Ayub Khan launched his coup d'etat from Rawalpindi. In 1959, the city became the interim capital of the country under Ayub Khan, who had sought the creation of a new planned capital of Islamabad in the vicinity of Rawalpindi. As a result, Rawalpindi saw most major central government offices and institutions relocate to nearby territory, and its population rapidly expand.

Construction of Pakistan's new capital city of Islamabad in 1961 led to greater investment in Rawalpindi. Rawalpindi remained the headquarters of the Pakistani Army after the capital shifted to Islamabad in 1969, while the Pakistan Air Force continues to maintain an airbase in the Chaklala district of Rawalpindi. The military dictatorship of General Zia ul Haq hanged Pakistan's deposed Prime Minister, Zulfikar Ali Bhutto, in Rawalpindi in 1979.

In 1980, tens of thousands of Shia protestors led by Mufti Jaffar Hussain marched on Rawalpindi to protest a provision of Zia ul Haqs Islamization programme. A spate of bombings in September 1987 took place in the city killing 5 people, in attacks that are believed to have been orchestrated by agents of Afghanistan's communist government.

On 10 April 1988, Rawalpindi's Ojhri Camp, an ammunition depot for Afghan mujahideen fighting against Soviet forces in Afghanistan, exploded and killed many in Rawalpindi and Islamabad. At the time, the New York Times reported more than 93 were killed and another 1,100 wounded; many believe that the toll was much higher.

Riots erupted in Rawalpindi in 1992 as mobs attacked Hindu temples in retaliation for the destruction of the Babri Masjid in India . On 27 December 2007, Rawalpindi was the site of the assassination of former Prime Minister Benazir Bhutto.

Modern Rawalpindi is socially and economically intertwined with Islamabad, and the greater metropolitan area. The city is also home to numerous suburban housing developments that serve as bedroom-communities for workers in Islamabad. In June 2015, the Rawalpindi-Islamabad Metrobus, a new bus rapid transit line with various points in Islamabad, opened for service.

Geography

Climate

Rawalpindi features a humid subtropical climate (Köppen: Cwa) with hot and wet summers, a cooler and drier winter. Rawalpindi and its twin city Islamabad, during the year experiences an average of 91 thunderstorms, which is the highest frequency of any plain elevation city in the country. Strong windstorms are frequent in the summer during which wind gusts have been reported by Pakistan Meteorological Department to have reached . In such thunder/wind storms, which results in some damage of infrastructure. The weather is highly variable due to the proximity of the city to the foothills of Himalayas.

However, westerly disturbances also bring quite significant rainfall in the winter. In summer, the record maximum temperature has soared to  recorded in June 1954, while it has dropped to a minimum of  several occasions, though the last of which was in January 1967.

Cityscape

Social structures in Rawalpindi's historic core centre around neighbourhoods, each known as a Mohallah. Each neighbourhood is served by a nearby bazaar and mosque, which in turn serve as a place where people can gather for trade and manufacturing. Each Mohallah has narrow gallies, and the grouping of houses around short lanes and cul-de-sacs lends a sense of privacy and security to residents of each neighbourhood. Major intersections in the neighbourhood are each referred to as a chowk.

Rawalpindi is relatively a new city contrasted with Pakistan's millennia-old cities such as Lahore, Multan, and Peshawar. South of Rawalpindi's historic core, and across the Lai Nullah, are the wide lanes of the Rawalpindi Cantonment. With tree-lined avenues and historic architecture, the cantonment was the main European area developed during British colonial rule. British colonialists also built the Saddar Bazaar south of the historic core, which served as a retail center geared towards Europeans in the city. Beyond the cantonment are the large suburban housing developments that serve as bedroom communities for Islamabad's commuter population.

Demographics

The population of Rawalpindi is 2,098,231 in 2017. 84% of the population is Punjabi, 9% is Pashtun, and 7% is from other ethnic groups.

Religion

96.8% of Rawalpindi's population is Muslim, 2.47% is Christian, 0.73% belong to other religious groups. The city's Kohaati Bazaar is site of large Shia mourning-processions for Ashura. The neighbourhoods of Waris Shah Mohallah and Pir Harra Mohallah form the core of Muslim settlement in Rawalpindi's old city.

Rawalpindi was a majority Hindu and Sikh city prior to the Partition of India in 1947, combined composing 51.05 percent of the total population according to the 1941 census. The same census detailed Muslims made up 43.79 percent of the total population. The Baba Dyal Singh Gurdwara in Rawalpindi was where the reformist Nirankari movement of Sikhism originated. The city still has a small Sikh population, but has been bolstered by the arrival of Sikhs fleeing political instability in Khyber Pakhtunkhwa.

The city is still home to a few hundred Hindu families. Despite the fact that the vast majority of the city's Hindus fled en masse to India after Partition, most Hindu temples in the old city remain standing, although in disrepair and often abandoned. Many of the old city's neighbourhoods continue to bear Hindu and Sikh names, such as Krishanpura, Arya Mohallah, Akaal Garh, Mohanpura, Amarpura, Kartarpura, Bagh Sardaraan, Angatpura.

The Shri Krishna Mandir  is the only functional Hindu temple in Rawalpindi. It was built in the Kabarri Bazaar in 1897. Other temples are abandoned or were repurposed. Rawalpindi's large Kalyan Das Temple from 1880 has been used as the "Gov't. Qandeel Secondary School for the Blind" since 1973. The Ram Leela Temple in Kanak Mandi, and the Kaanji Mal Ujagar Mal Ram Richpal Temple in the Kabarri Bazaar, are both currently used to house Kashmiri refugees. Mohan Temple in the Lunda Bazaar remains standing, but is abandoned and the building no longer used for any purpose. The city's "Shamshan Ghat" serves as the city's cremation grounds, and was partly renovated in 2012.

The city's Babu Mohallah neighbourhood was once home to a community of Jewish traders that had fled Mashhad, Persia in the 1830s. The community had entirely emigrated to Israel by the 1960s.

In the British era many churches were built for the British soldiers to come to the churches for Sunday prayer because
Rawalpindi Cantonment was the home for the British Army.

Transportation

Public transportation

The Rawalpindi-Islamabad Metrobus is a  bus rapid transit system operating in the Islamabad-Rawalpindi metropolitan area. The Metrobus network's first phase was opened on 4 June 2015, and stretches 22.5 kilometres between Pak Secretariat, in Islamabad, and Saddar in Rawalpindi. The second stage stretches 25.6 kilometres between the Peshawar Morr Interchange and New Islamabad International Airport and was inaugurated on 18 April 2022. The system uses e-ticketing and an Intelligent Transportation System and is managed by the Punjab Mass Transit Authority.

Road
Rawalpindi is situated along the historic Grand Trunk Road that connects Peshawar to Islamabad and Lahore. The road is roughly paralleled by the M-1 Motorway between Peshawar and Rawalpindi, while the M-2 Motorway provides an alternate route to Lahore via the Salt Range. The Grand Trunk Road also provides access to the Afghan border via the Khyber Pass, with onwards connections to Kabul and Central Asia via the Salang Pass. The Karakoram Highway provides access between Islamabad and western China, and an alternate route to Central Asia via Kashgar in the Chinese region of Xinjiang.

The Islamabad Expressway connects Rawalpindi's eastern portions with the Rawal Lake and heart of Islamabad. The IJP Road separates Rawalpindi's northern edge from Islamabad.

Motorways

Rawalpindi is connected to Peshawar by the M-1 Motorway.  The motorway also links Rawalpindi to major cities in the Khyber Pakhtunkhwa province, such as Charsadda and Mardan. The M-2 motorway offers high speed access to Lahore via the Potohar Plateau and Salt Range. The M-3 Motorway branches off from the M-2 at the city of Pindi Bhattian, where the M-3 offers onward connections to Faisalabad, and connects to the M-4 Motorway which continues onward to Multan. A new motorway network is under construction to connect Multan and Karachi as part of the China Pakistan Economic Corridor. The Hazara Motorway is also under construction as part of CPEC, and will provide control-access motorway travel all the way to Mansehra via the M-1 or Grand Trunk Road.

Rail
Rawalpindi railway station in the Saddar neighbourhood serves as a stop along Pakistan's -long Main Line-1 railway that connects the city to the port city of Karachi to Peshawar. The stations is served by the Awam Express, Hazara Express, Islamabad Express, Jaffar Express, Khyber Mail trains, and serves as the terminus for the Margalla Express, Mehr Express, Rawal Express, Pakistan Express, Subak Raftar Express, Green Line Express, Sir Syed Express, Subak Kharam Express and Tezgam trains.

The entire Main Line-1 railway track between Karachi and Peshawar is to be overhauled at a cost of $3.65 billion for the first phase of the project, with completion by 2021. Upgrading of the railway line will permit train travel at speeds of 160 kilometres per hour, versus the average 60 to 105 km per hour speed currently possible on existing track.

Air
Rawalpindi is served by the Islamabad International Airport. The airport is located 21 km west of the city. It offers non-stop flights throughout Pakistan, as well as to the Middle East, Europe, North America, Central Asia, East Asia and Southeast Asia.

Administrative divisions

The City-District of Rawalpindi is sub-divided into one Municipal Corporation Two Cantonment Board and Seven tehsils:
Rawalpindi Municipal Corporation Rawalpindi City 
Rawalpindi Cantonment Board Rawalpindi Cantt 
Chaklala Cantonment Board Chaklala Cantt 

Rawalpindi also holds many private colonies that have developed themselves rapidly, e.g. Gulraiz Housing Society, Korang Town, Agochs Town, Ghori Town, Pakistan Town, Judicial Town, Bahria Town which is the Asia's largest private colony, Kashmir Housing Society, Danial Town, Al-Haram City, Education City, Gul Afshan Colony, Allama Iqbal Colony.

Parks

Ayub National Park is located beyond the old Presidency on Jhelum Road. Rawalpindi Public Park is on Murree Road near Shamsabad. The Park was opened to the public in 1991. It has a playland for children, grassy lawns, fountains and flower beds.

In 2008 Jinnah Park was inaugurated at the heart of Rawalpindi and has since become a hotspot of activity for the city. It houses a state-of-the-art cinema, Cinepax, a Metro Cash and Carry supermart, an outlet of McDonald's, gaming lounges, Motion Rides and other recreational facilities. The vast lawns also provide an adequate picnic spot.

Rawalpindi is situated near the Ayub National Park formerly known as 'Topi Rakh' (keep the hat on) is by the old Presidency, between the Murree Brewery Co. and Grand Trunk Road. This park hosts "The Jungle Kingdom" which is particularly popular among young residents.
Liaquat Bagh, formerly known as the "company bagh" (East India Company's Garden), is of great historical interest. The first prime minister of Pakistan, Liaquat Ali Khan, was assassinated here in 1950. Pakistan's Prime Minister Benazir Bhutto was assassinated here on 27 December 2007. She was the youngest and the only woman to be elected as Prime Minister of Pakistan.
Rawalpindi Public Park (previously Nawaz Sharif Park, renamed Iqbal Park in 2019) is located on Murree Road just opposite to the Arid Agriculture University Rawalpindi. The park was opened in 1991. It has a play area for children, lawns, fountains and flower beds. A cricket stadium was built in 1992 opposite the public park. Several matches in the 1996 World Cup were held on this cricket ground.

Economy

Education

Rawalpindi District is home to 2,463 government public schools, out of which 1706 are primary schools, 306 middle schools, 334 are high schools, while 117 are higher education colleges.

97.4% of children ages 6–16 in urban areas of Rawalpindi District are enrolled in school – the third highest percentage in Pakistan after Islamabad and Karachi. 77.1% of Rawalpindi's students in Class 5 are able to read sentences in English. 27% of children in Rawalpindi attend paid private schools.

Board of Intermediate and Secondary Education, Rawalpindi, established in 1978 to conduct SSC and HSSC examinations.
Pir Mehr Ali Shah, Arid Agriculture University (also known as Barani University) is a renowned public university offering research and education in a number of fields and specializing in agriculture. It is on the Murree Road and is placed near other landmarks of the city including the Rawalpindi Cricket Stadium, Rawalpindi Public Park, Rawalpindi Arts Council etc. Arid University is the only university providing agriculture related degrees in Rawalpindi and Islamabad.
Army Medical College is also known as the College of Medical Sciences and is on Abid Majid Road in Rawalpindi. Separate computer labs are available for post-graduate and undergraduate students. Other facilities in the campus include a library, cafeteria, college mosque, swimming pool, gym, squash court, and auditorium. There are seven hostels for male and female students near the college campus.
College of Electrical & Mechanical Engineering is located on Grand Trunk Road in Rawalpindi, EME is the largest constituent college of NUST. The campus includes all on-campus facilities, auditorium and conference hall, accommodation and mess facilities. The library is fully computerized, with a collection of 70,000 volumes.
Rawalpindi University is on Hamayun Road in Rawalpindi Cantt; it is the oldest constituent college of NUST before, founded in 2022 after the  Pakistani Khan government to train the members of Pakistan Armed Forces. The College of Telecommunication Engineering is located on this campus. The MCS library is computerized, with over 55,000 volumes.
Rawalpindi Medical University provides education in health care. It is a comprehensive, state-assisted institution. It was established in March 1974.It has the highest enrollment of 350 students among medical colleges in Pakistan.
The Rawalpindi Public Library was one of the earliest private public libraries organized after separation from India. The building was donated for a public library by the then-Deputy Commissioner Major Davis on the initiative of philanthropist Khurshid Anwar Jilani, an attorney, writer and social worker. However, the building was confiscated for election and political campaigning during the last days of Field Marshal Ayub Khan's reign, and rare manuscripts and artifacts were taken away by the influential.
Fatima Jinnah Women University The first ever Women University of Pakistan
Gordon College Rawalpindi is one of the oldest colleges located in the heart of the city. It was established in 1872. College offers Graduate and master's degree program. Historically the college has been known for its cultural activities as it has one of the largest auditorium in which stage dramas and other programs were regularly conducted. College remained co-education until the early 1970s but after Zia-ul-Haq regime it was converted to boys only.
Foundation University RWP Campus located in new Lalazar alongside FFCB. They offer mainly IT and Biotech related courses like Phd in Computer Science etc.
Rawalpindi Women University The Rawalpindi Women University is a public university funded by the Government of Punjab. The university has been running 15 BS Honors,16 Masters and 1 M.Phil. program successfully.

Media
Rawalpindi, being so close to the capital, has an active media and newspaper climate. There are over a dozen of newspaper companies based in the city including Daily Nawa-i-Waqt, Daily Jang, Daily Asas, The Daily Sada-e-Haq, Daily Express, Daily Din, Daily Aajkal Rawalpindi, Daily Islam, and Daily Pakistan in Urdu and Dawn, Express Tribune, Daily Times, The News International and The Nation in English.

There are a large number of Cable TV service providers in the city such as Nayatel, PTCL, SA Cable Network and DWN.
Pakistan Broadcasting Corporation has a centre in Rawalpindi
Television channels based in Rawalpindi include:
ATV
Lights Asia
Aapna Channel
Pothohari TV (Regional language channel)
City 51
Pahariwood Network (Regional language channel)
K2 TV
Oxygene TV
Samaa News

Recreation

In mid-2012 3D cinema, The Arena, started its operations in Bahria Town Phase-4 in Rawalpindi.

Rawalpindi Golf Course was completed in 1926 by Rawalpindi Golf Club, one of the oldest golf clubs of Pakistan. The facility was initially developed as a nine-hole course. After several phases of development, it is now a 27-hole course and the biggest in Pakistan. From the clubhouse, there is a panoramic view of Faisal Mosque, the twin cities of Islamabad and Rawalpindi. Major domestic golf tournaments are regularly held here.
Playland is another public park parallel to Ayub Park
In 2019, after the Army Heritage Foundation took over Ayub park from Chaklala Cantonment Board, a new amusement park called JoyLand was opened on the site of a previously failed project. This newly developed park has a number of rides and activities for visitors, from the relaxing Ferris wheel to the daring Discovery. All rides are imported and meet safety standards. JoyLand is the only amusement park in Pakistan that is ISO 9001:2008 certified.

See also

 Bappa Rawal
 Central Jail Rawalpindi
 Christ Church Rawalpindi
 Dhamial
 General Headquarters (Pakistan Army)
 Lal Haveli
 Mewar
 Military Hospital Rawalpindi
 Murree Road
 Pakhral
 Rawalpindi Gazetteer

Notes

References

Bibliography

External links

City District Government Rawalpindi, Official Website, archived at 13 March 2008
Rawalpindi (Pakistan) – Britannica Online Encyclopedia

 
 
Metropolitan areas of Pakistan
Populated places established in the 1490s
1493 establishments in Asia
Former national capitals
Populated places in Punjab, Pakistan